The Gran Premio Industria e Commercio Artigianato Carnaghese is a single-day road bicycle race held annually in Carnago, Italy. From 2005 to 2012, the race was organised as a 1.1 event on the UCI Europe Tour. Since 2013, it's held as an amateur event.

Winners

External links
 

UCI Europe Tour races
Cycle races in Italy
Recurring sporting events established in 1972
1972 establishments in Italy